Hunshelf is a civil parish in the metropolitan borough of Barnsley, South Yorkshire, England.  The ward contains 23 listed buildings that are recorded in the National Heritage List for England.  Of these, one is listed at Grade I, the highest of the three grades, and the others are at Grade II, the lowest grade.  Apart from the hamlet of Green Moor, the parish is entirely rural.  There are remnants of its industrial past in Wortley Top Forge, which is "one of only three water-powered hammer forges surviving in the United Kingdom".  This is listed together with associated buildings.  Most of the other listed buildings in the parish are farmhouses, farm buildings, and associated structures.  The rest of the listed buildings consist of a guide post, a deer paddock, three bridges, and a set of stocks.


Key

Buildings

References

Citations

Sources

 

Lists of listed buildings in South Yorkshire
Buildings and structures in the Metropolitan Borough of Barnsley